"King of Rock" is a 1985 single by Run–D.M.C. and the title track from their album of the same name. It was featured in the video games Guitar Hero: Aerosmith,  Thrasher: Skate and Destroy, Call of Duty: Infinite Warfare, and is a downloadable track on Rock Band 3. The song was performed by the group at the 1985 Live Aid concert. Eddie Martinez is the song's lead guitarist and appears in the video.

Cash Box said that the song is "in the traditional boasting rap themes which touches on humor and raw social critique and makes Run D.M.C. one of the few rap groups which can transcend its original trappings."

The music video featured Calvert DeForest as a security guard.

Cover versions
In 1996, the song was covered by Institute of Technology for the electro-industrial various artists compilation Operation Beatbox.

References in popular culture

"King of Rock" is heard in the 2010 movie Cop Out.
The song is featured in the film Ready To Rumble as Jimmy King's entrance theme.
The Beastie Boys' song "Putting Shame In Your Game" from the album Hello Nasty includes the lyrics "I'm the king of Boggle, there is none higher/I get eleven points from the word quagmire", a reference to the opening lines of "King of Rock."

Track listing
7" - Profile (US)
 "King of Rock" – 4:38
 "King of Rock (Instrumental)" – 4:10

12" - Profile (US)
 "King of Rock" – 6:15
 "King of Rock (Instrumental)" – 6:34

Charts

References

1984 songs
1985 singles
Run-DMC songs
Songs written by Darryl McDaniels
Songs written by Joseph Simmons
Songs written by Jam Master Jay
Songs written by Russell Simmons
Profile Records singles
4th & B'way Records singles